Gibson is a single-member electoral district for the South Australian House of Assembly. It was created by the redistribution conducted in 2016, and was contested for the first time at the 2018 state election. It replaced the former seat of Bright.

Gibson lies southwest of the Adelaide city centre and includes the suburbs of Brighton, Dover Gardens, Hove, Marion, North Brighton, Oaklands Park, Seacombe Gardens, South Brighton, Sturt, Warradale and the southern portion of Somerton Park.

Since 2022 it has been represented by Sarah Andrews of the Labor Party.

Members for Gibson

Election results

Notes

References
 ECSA profile for Gibson: 2018
 ABC profile for Gibson: 2018
 Poll Bludger profile for Gibson: 2018

Gibson
2018 establishments in Australia